Gaetano De Rosa (born 10 May 1973 in Düsseldorf, West Germany) is an Italian retired football defender.

History
Although born in Germany, De Rosa is entirely of Italian background with family from the Alps and Naples. Indeed, it was with local side Napoli that he first broke through into the youth side, before making it professionally with the club in the early 1990s. He is best known for his long-standing period with Bari in the Serie A, where he established himself as a mainstay for the galletti. In 2004, he left Bari to join Reggina, where he spent a total two seasons. In 2006, he signed for Serie B's Genoa, helping his side to win promotion to the top flight. After spending another season with Genoa, he was released in July 2008, and confirmed his retirement from active football later on September.

References

1973 births
Living people
Italian footballers
Italy under-21 international footballers
Association football defenders
Serie A players
Serie B players
Genoa C.F.C. players
U.S. Pistoiese 1921 players
S.S.C. Bari players
Reggina 1914 players
Palermo F.C. players
S.S.C. Napoli players
Footballers from Düsseldorf